675 Ludmilla is a minor planet orbiting the Sun. It was named after Mikhail Glinka's opera Ruslan and Lyudmila.

References

External links 
 
 

000675
Discoveries by Joel Hastings Metcalf
Named minor planets
000675
000675
19080830